Psychophora sabini is a moth of the family Geometridae first described by William Kirby in 1824. It is found in northern Europe, Asia and northern North America, including Greenland. The habitat consists of rocky heath, mostly above 1,000 meters above sea level.

The wingspan is 22–29 mm. Adults are on wing in July. They feed on the nectar of various flowers, but mainly Silene acaulis.

The larvae feed on Vaccinium myrtillus. Larvae can be found from August to June. It overwinters as a larva.

Subspecies
Psychophora sabini sabini (North America)
Psychophora sabini frigidaria (Guenee, 1858)
Psychophora sabini polaris Hulst, 1903

References

Xanthorhoini
Moths of Europe
Insects of the Arctic
Taxa named by William Kirby (entomologist)
Moths described in 1824